Nadol is a census town in Desuri tehsil of Pali district, India. Ashapura Mataji temple and Shri Nadol Tirth attract pilgrims.

History

Nadol was originally called Naddula. The Chahamanas of Naddula (called Chauhans of Nadol in vernacular legends) ruled the town and its surrounding areas during the 10th-12th century CE. Their founder was Lakshmana, a prince of the Shakambhari Chahamana dynasty. He carved out a principality at Nadol, while his brother Simharaja ascended the ancestral throne. Nadol was ruled by his descendants until Jayatasimha was defeated by the Ghurids. Later, the Jalor Chahamana king Udayasimha (a relative of Jayatasimha) captured Nadol. The area was captured by the Delhi Sultanate after Alauddin Khalji defeated Udayasimha's descendant Kanhadadeva in 1311.

Recent excavations by Dept. of Archaeology, Rajasthan has revealed that though this area was occupied since Stone age, Nadol was a flourishing town 
during 9th-10th century. First excavation was done in 1996, but recent excavation done at Juna Khera has revealed traces of Living rooms, Kitchen, furnaces. Stone blocks of marble and granite were used in construction of buildings, mud mortar was also used in construction. Coins from Chauhan era were also found.

Demographics

According to Census 2001, Nadol has a population of 9,020, where male are 4,437 and female are 4,583.

References

Bibliography 
 

Villages in Pali district